Lochac, Locach or Locat is a country far south of China mentioned by Marco Polo. The name is widely believed to be a variant of Lo-huk 罗斛: the Cantonese name for the southern Thai kingdom of Lopburi (also known as Lavapura and Louvo), which was a province of the Khmer Empire at the time.

However, it has also been suggested that Polo or his sources in China were referring to other locations or conflating several different places as Lochac.

Theories regarding Lopburi and the Khmer Empire 
Marco Polo may also have used "Locach" to mean the Khmer Empire in general. One piece of evidence for this is the "golden towers" that Polo reported in Locach, which were more likely inspired by the  golden spires of Angkor Wat, the capital of the Khmer Empire (than the Lopburi of his time). As Zhou Daguan, the ambassador sent by the Yuan court to Cambodia in 1296 commented: "These [golden towers] are the monuments that have caused merchants from overseas to speak so often of ‘Zhenla [Cambodia] the rich and noble’."

The imprisonment of a Mongol emissary by the Khmer ruler Jayavarman VIII in 1281 would have been ample justification for Polo's allegation of the inhumanity of its people. He said that Locach was "such a savage place that few people ever go there" and that "the king himself does not want anyone to go there or to spy out his treasure or the state of his realm". Polo also noted an abundance of elephants in Locach; in the Chinese annals, Locach was notable for sending elephants as tribute.

Subsequent maps and theories
A Pentan mentioned by Polo appears to be the island of Bintan. Likewise Malaiur was the old Tamil name for the Sumatran city of Jambi (and is the origin of the national name Malay).

A mistranscription of Locach, Beach, originated with the 1532 editions of the Novus Orbis Regionum by Simon Grynaeus and Johann Huttich, in which Marco Polo's Locach was changed to Boëach, which was later shortened to Beach. 
Abraham Ortelius inscribed on his 1564 world map: Latinum exemplar habet Boeach sed male ut fere omnium: Nos italico usi fuimus (A Latin version has Boeach, but mistakenly: like almost everyone we have used the Italian).

On Gerard Mercator's 1538 map of the world, Locat is situated in Indochina, south of Champa (Ciamba).

On Guillaume Le Testu’s 1556 Cosmographie Universel,  Locach appears to be named La Joncade – an island off a promontory of the southern continent, Terre australle, to the eastward of Grande Jaue, a northward-extending promontory of the Terre australle (Terra Australis) to the south of Java. However, some scholars see in La Jocade a resemblance to the North Island of New Zealand.

In 1769, the East India Company hydrographer, Alexander Dalrymple, stated that the northern part of New Holland "seems to be what Marco-Polo calls Lochae".

Paul Wheatley, after G. Pauthier (who reads Locach as Soucat), and Henry Yule (1866), believe that the place referred to was in Borneo, such as: West Kalimantan, Sukadana or Lawai (arch. Laue; Lawai, near the Kapuas River).
	
According to a recent Chinese version of The Travels of Marco Polo translated by Chen Kaijun, etc., Marco Polo traveled to islands Sondur and Kondur, 1,126 km south of Java, and then traveled 80 km southeast and arrived at Lochac 罗斛.

Footnotes

References

Further reading 

Robert J. King, "Marco Polo and the Question of Locach", Map Matters, Issue 25, January 2015. 
Robert J. King, "Marco Polo’s Java and Locach on Mercator’s world maps of 1538 and 1569, and globe of 1541", The Globe, no.81, 2017, pp. 41–61.
Robert J. King, "Finding Marco Polo’s Locach", Terrae Incognitae, vol.50, no.1, April 2018, pp. 1–18.

Khmer Empire
Marco Polo
Mythological kingdoms, empires, and countries